The Annapolis Road Line, designated Route T18, is a daily bus route operated by the Washington Metropolitan Area Transit Authority between the New Carrollton station of the Orange Line of the Washington Metro and the Rhode Island Avenue–Brentwood station of the Red Line of the Washington Metro. The line operates every 12 minutes during the weekdays between 7AM and 9PM and 45-60 minutes after 9PM. T18 trips roughly take 50 minutes.

Background
Route T18 also operates alongside route T14 but under different line names and routes. Route T18 also runs a direct route while route T14 runs primarily thru neighborhoods. Route T18 operates weekly between New Carrollton station and Rhode Island Avenue–Brentwood station providing service along Annapolis Road and connecting passengers between Prince Georges County and Northeast. Route T18 also runs a limited stop segment between Mount Rainier terminal and Rhode Island Avenue-Brentwood station alongside routes G9 and T14 only stopping along five stops. Local service is provided by routes 83 and 86.

Route T18 currently operates out of Landover division.

T18 stops

History
Route T18 was created as a brand new Metrobus Route by WMATA on December 3, 1978 to operate between New Carrollton station and Rhode Island Avenue–Brentwood station shortly after New Carrollton station opened on November 20, 1978. 

Route T18 was designed to replace the segment of routes T14, T16, and T17 routing between Annapolis Road in New Carrollton and the Rhode Island Avenue Metro Station, via Capital Plaza Mall, since routes T14, T16, and T17 were truncated to terminate at New Carrollton. 

Route T18 would operate along Ellin Road, Harkins Road, and Annapolis Road, then divert off Annapolis Road after passing the Baltimore–Washington Parkway and Capital Plaza, and make a loop along 57th Avenue, 58th Avenue, Emerson Street, and then 57th Avenue to serve Bladensburg High School, as well as the adjacent apartment complexes. Then the route returns onto Annapolis Road remaining straight on Annapolis Road and Bladensburg Road, then turn onto the intersection of 38th Avenue and 38th Street, another left turn at the intersection of Rhode Island Avenue and remain straight on Rhode Island Avenue before reaching the intersection of Washington Place NE and ultimately making a left turn onto that street to enter Rhode Island Avenue–Brentwood station. Route T18 would then turn back and operate on the same routing (except in the exact opposite direction), back towards New Carrollton station.

Limited Stop Segment
Beginning on December 14, 2014, route T18 began a newly limited stop segment along Rhode Island Avenue between Mount Rainier terminal and Rhode Island Avenue-Brentwood station along with route T14. The limited stop segment was to reduce bus bunching along Rhode Island Avenue and improve on time performance for route T14, and T18. Buses would only serve the following stops:
 Rhode Island Ave & 12th St NE
 Rhode Island Ave & Montana Ave NE (eastbound)/14th St NE (westbound)
 Rhode Island Ave & 18th St NE
 Rhode Island Ave & South Dakota Ave NE (eastbound)/24th St NE (westbound)
 Rhode Island Ave & Newton St NE
Passengers wishing for local service will have to use routes 83 or 86.

Incidents
On January 10, 2022, a man was stabbed on board a T18 bus along Rhode Island Avenue between 14th Street and Montana Avenue. The suspect ran away from the scene.

References

T18